The Estonian Radical Socialist Party (ERSP) was a political party in Estonia.

History
The party was founded on 6 May 1917 in Tallinn in order to contest the Estonian Provincial Assembly elections that year. Its initial leaders were Jüri Vilms and Eduard Laaman. The party co-operated closely with the Social Travaillist Party and the two became known as the "Labourites".

The Labourites won 11 of the 62 seats in the Assembly elections, becoming the second-largest faction after the Rural League, and went on to finish second in the 1918 Constituent Assembly elections.

In 1919 the two parties merged to form the Estonian Labour Party.

Ideology
The Radical Socialist Party was founded as a clearly left-wing party, that supported social equality, democracy, but also liberal economic policies, and had a similar programme to the Russian Trudoviks. Its voters came from the poorer classes and therefore it had a radical approach to the land reform and advocated the separation of church and state and a democratic constitution, which would give more power to the parliament.

References

Socialist parties in Estonia
Political parties established in 1917
Political parties disestablished in 1919
Defunct political parties in Estonia
Political parties of the Russian Revolution